Mbulelo Sogoni (born 16 January 1966) is a South African politician. A member of the African National Congress (ANC), Sogoni became the fourth Premier of the Eastern Cape on 25 July 2008 when he replaced Nosimo Balindlela until he was succeeded by Noxolo Kiviet on 6 May 2009 following 2009 election. Sogoni entered politics in the trade union movement during apartheid in South Africa and unsuccessfully lobbied for Thabo Mbeki to remain President of the ANC during the 2007 National Conference.

References

1966 births
Living people
People from the Eastern Cape
Xhosa people
African National Congress politicians
Premiers of the Eastern Cape
South African trade unionists